Liberty Hall, also known as John Robert McDowell Place, is a historic plantation house near Camden, Alabama.  The two-story Greek Revival style main house was built in 1855 for John Robert McDowell by W.W. Robinson.  The two-story front portico features two central Ionic columns flanked by a square column to each side, reminiscent of a distyle-in-antis arrangement.  The floor plan is centered on a broad hall that separates four large, equally proportioned rooms on both levels. The formal rooms and hall on the lower level have elaborate plasterwork that was designed, in part, by Harriet McDowell, wife of John Robert McDowell.  The house is currently owned by the great-granddaughter of the original owner.  It was added to the National Register of Historic Places on January 5, 1984.

References

External links

National Register of Historic Places in Wilcox County, Alabama
Houses on the National Register of Historic Places in Alabama
Houses completed in 1855
Greek Revival houses in Alabama
Plantation houses in Alabama
Houses in Wilcox County, Alabama
Historic American Buildings Survey in Alabama